Mark Draycott (born 12 January 1985) is a footballer who plays for Hungerford Town in the Southern Football League Premier Division.

Career
Draycott began his career as a trainee with Swindon Town, where he scored goals at all levels up to and including the reserves before he was released in 2003. He represented the Republic of Ireland at youth level. He still holds the record for the most goals scored in the FA Youth Cup in one season, breaking the record set by Wayne Rooney, after scoring 11 in the 2002–2003 campaign, including seven in a second round 9–2 win over Chelmsford City.

After being released by Swindon at the end of the 2003 campaign, Draycott travelled to the United States, where he played for Portland Timbers and Wilmington Hammerheads, before returning to England with non-league clubs Newport County and Swindon Supermarine.

While with Supermarine he scored six times – a hat trick in each half – for them in a 6–3 Southern Premier League win at Hanwell Town. The English Football Association's official website reported the achievement, noting no player had scored more than five goals in a full England international or Premiership match. It could only find a nine-goal game in an FA Cup first-round game in 1971 and a 10-goal spree in a Third Division match from 1936.

In the summer of 2007 Draycott flew west to join the Ventura County Fusion of the USL Premier Development League, where he was one of the stars of the division, scoring six goals in six games for the Fusion and attracting the attention of scouts from Los Angeles Galaxy. After the Fusion failed to make the PDL Playoffs, Draycott returned to England and, after a short spell with Cirencester Town, joined for his third stint with Swindon Supermarine.

He joined Didcot Town prior to start of the 2009/10 Southern Football League Premier Division, and went on to score 16 goals in his debut season with the Railwaymen. After Didcot he joined Hungerford Town for the 2011–12 season.

References

External links
 Swindon Supermarine historical player archive entry

1985 births
Living people
Sportspeople from Swindon
English footballers
Association football forwards
Swindon Town F.C. players
Portland Timbers (2001–2010) players
Chippenham Town F.C. players
Wilmington Hammerheads FC players
Swindon Supermarine F.C. players
Newport County A.F.C. players
Caroline Springs George Cross FC players
Ventura County Fusion players
Cirencester Town F.C. players
Didcot Town F.C. players
Hungerford Town F.C. players
A-League (1995–2004) players
USL League Two players
Southern Football League players
English expatriate footballers
Expatriate soccer players in the United States
English expatriate sportspeople in the United States